Natália Camurça Carvalho, is a  singer, songwriter. Born in Fortaleza, Brazil.
Natalia Damini started her career at 17 years old with her first single Feeling The Love which became a very popular song in Brazil.

Career
At 18 Natalia moved to São Paulo and released her second single Your Lies which went No. 1 on the international dance sales charts and she was nominated for best dance artist at the Dj Sound Awards. Natalia teamed up with Charve The Don, Concore Entertainment CEO and released her Bad Girl EP which debut on iTunes Music Pop Charts at No. 32 and then she went on to release her debut album Beautiful in 2014 which reach No. 16 on iTunes Music Pop Charts, the album features Nicki Minaj, Gucci Mane and The Shop Boyz.
Natalia also teamed up with Lil Wayne and Rezzo on the single Can't Stop Me. Natalia Damini is the first artist from Brazil to have a major presence in the American music scene and has been featured in some of the biggest publications in music and also graces the cover of numerous magazines. Natalia Damini's single Crazy reached No. 1 in September 2015 on the Billboard Emerging Artists Chart, No. 9 on Billboard Trending 140 and No. 1 on Spotify Top 25 Most Played Songs. Natalia's current single "On The Floor" is No. 1 on DRT Independent Charts and Cashbox Magazine Charts No. 38 on DRT National Charts and Cashbox Magazine Charts.
In 2020 Natalia Damini releases "Pacemaker" featuring Petey Pablo peak #1 on Digital Radio Chart, debut #36 on Billboard Mainstream Indicator Chart and #50 on Mediabase All Published Top 50 Chart.

Discography

Compilation

Singles

Tours
2011 – 2012 Natalia Damini
2013 – Feel The Music
2013 – Sublimation Tour
2016 – Natalia Damini Tour

Music videos

Awards

Underground Music Awards
2015
Best Female R&B/POP artist

References

External links
 

1992 births
Brazilian pop singers
English-language singers from Brazil
People from Fortaleza
Living people
21st-century Brazilian singers
21st-century Brazilian women singers